Harry George Goelitz (January 9, 1894 – May 14, 1971) was an American athlete. He competed in the men's decathlon at the 1920 Summer Olympics.

Goelitz was trained at Oak Park and River Forest High School by Bob Zuppke, and at Mercersburg Academy by Jimmy Curran. In late 1913 he was thrown out of Mercersburg due to leaving the grounds without permission. He transferred to Keewatin Academy in Wisconsin.

In 1921 Goelitz's leg was crushed between a cement mixer and a road roller. He was rushed to hospital and recovered, but it is likely this accident ended his athletics career.

References

1894 births
1971 deaths
Athletes (track and field) at the 1920 Summer Olympics
American male decathletes
Olympic track and field athletes of the United States
Sportspeople from Oak Park, Illinois
Track and field athletes from Illinois
Olympic decathletes